The Fogo Island Cup (Portuguese: Taça (Copa) da Ilha do Fogo, Capeverdean Crioulo, ALUPEC or ALUPEK: Tasa da Djarfogu, Fogo: Taça da Djarfogu (Djarfogo) or Djar Fogu (Fogo)) is a  regional cup competition and is played during the season in the island of Fogo, Cape Verde, it consists of all the clubs from all the two regional divisions and are divided into about four to five rounds, for some seasons, a group stage was featured.  The cup competition is organized by the Fogo Regional Football Association (Associação Regional do Fogo, ARFF). The cup winner competes in the regional super cup final in the following season when a cup winner also wins the championship, a runner-up competes.  For several seasons, the winner qualified into Cape Verdean Cup which has been cancelled due to financial and scheduling reasons.

The first cup competition took place in 2001, the 2013–14 and the 2014-15 editions were cancelled, the 2015 one was not held due to the volcanic eruption that happened on Pico do Fogo. The 2016 cup competition took place, the 2016 final did not take place, it is unknown that it was cancelled.

In the 2008 edition, Académica got Guy Cabral 2 yellow cards and was suspended in the cup final match with Valência, the club won 2-0. Guy Cabral later appeared in a June 28 national championship match and fans protested the result of 0-1 as they fielded Guy Cabral, Sporting was awarded 3-0.  Today, the match suspensions at the regional level does not include the national level whereas a player at the regional level are suspended only at the regional level as Cape Verde used the old league system formerly used in other countries such as Brazil.

Académica do Fogo won their recent title after defeating Vulcânicos. The upcoming 2018 edition which will be on March 31 will be Académica in their second consecutive final appearance and Botafogo, their next finals appearance in eight years.

Winners
Source:

See also
Sports in Fogo, Cape Verde
Fogo Premier Division
Fogo Island Super Cup
Fogo Champion's Cup (or Trophy)
Fogo Opening Tournament

Notes

References

Sport in Fogo, Cape Verde
Football cup competitions in Cape Verde
2001 establishments in Cape Verde